Alive N Kickin’ (known originally as Alive and Kicking) is an American pop group formed in Brooklyn, New York. Led by singers Pepe Cardona and Sandy Toder, they are best known for their 1970 hit "Tighter, Tighter", which peaked number seven on the US Billboard Hot 100 chart.

The groups initial run lasted from 1968 to 1971, during which they were unable to find any other success outside of "Tighter, Tighter" making them one-hit wonder. In 1976, most of the original line-up reformed where they continued to perform with a changing line-up over the years.

Formation
The six original members formed the band when they were teenagers in 1968 in guitarist Dave Shearer's basement. The group included Sandy Toder and Pepe Cardona (vocals), Bruce Sudano (keyboards),  Woody Wilson (bass), Dave Shearer (guitar), and Jeff Miller (keyboards). They gained some popularity when they began recording for Tommy James on the label he was signed to, Roulette Records.

"Tighter, Tighter"
In early 1970, the band began recording sessions. A song written and produced by Tommy James, Bob King and arranged by Jimmy Wisner was to be recorded, and although James originally considered having his friends do this song—now known as "Crystal Blue Persuasion"—he liked it so much he decided to keep it for himself. As a gesture of friendship to the group, he wrote "Tighter, Tighter" for them. After recording the hit song the group replaced Vito Albano (drums, percussion) and Dave with Ronny Pell and Johnny Parisio. With the new line-up, "Tighter, Tighter" was released.

The song was released in May 1970 and stayed on the US chart for 16 weeks.  It sold over one million copies and received a gold disc awarded by the R.I.A.A.

Two singles were almost immediately released to ride on the good fortune of the hit song, but after a lack of success with "Just Let It Come" and "London Bridge", and after increasing difficulties with their producer Morris Levy and the label's insistence on trying to make more singles so quickly, the band quietly broke up in the fall of 1971.

Members
Most of the group reunited in 1976 with a line-up that now included Cardona (vocals), Wilson (lead guitar), Shearer (rhythm guitar), Albano (drums), and new member Richie Incorvaia (bass). This new version of the band played throughout the tri-state area from the mid-1970s till the late 1980s. Today the band has a new and revised line-up once more, although Cardona and Parisio have remained a constant presence within the band. Wilson, Albano, and Shearer are no longer members of the band, and Incorvaia has died.

As of August 2013, the band members were:

Pepe Cardona - Lead Vocals (died 2020)  
Elaine Tuttle - Vocals
John Parisio - Guitar
Jeff Miller - Keyboards
Chris Vega - Bass
Sal G. - Sax
Zoe Grella - Drums

Pepe Cardona was diagnosed with stage-3 pancreatic cancer in August 2019. The tumor was removed in April 2020, but it had spread to his stomach. Cardona died on July 28, 2020, at age 72.

Discography

Singles

Albums

See also
 List of 1970s one-hit wonders in the United States

References

External links
Official website
Alive N Kickin' video clips
Interview With Pepe Cardona

Musical groups from New York (state)
Musical groups established in 1968